Club Marino de Luanco is a Spanish football team based in Luanco, in the autonomous community of Asturias. Founded in 1931 it plays in Segunda División RFEF – Group 1, holding home games at Estadio Miramar, with a capacity of 3,500 seats.

History
Marino Luanco was founded in 1931 by a group of local people, mainly fishermen. It played its first games in La Ribera beach, where nowadays takes place the Torneo Tenis Playa. Four years later, the team was registered in the Asturian Football Federation.

Marino played for the first time in Tercera División in the 1956–57 season. During the next 40 years, the club alternated Tercera and Regional Leagues, until it was promoted to Segunda División B in 1996. In its first season, Marino was relegated after qualifying last.

The club returned to Segunda División B in 2001, after being the champion of the Asturian group of Tercera and winning the Copa Federación de España and was close to reach the promotion playoffs to Segunda División in the 2001–02 season.

Marino continues to alternate seasons between Segunda División B and Tercera División and has consolidated as one of the most important clubs in Asturias.

Season to season

14 seasons in Segunda División B
2 seasons in Segunda División RFEF
29 seasons in Tercera División

Current squad

Honours
Tercera División (3): 1998–99, 2000–01, 2010–11
Copa RFEF (1): 2000–01
Copa RFEF (Asturias tournament) (6): 2000, 2004, 2006, 2009, 2013, 2015

Famous players
 Idrissa Keita
 Kily
 Francisco Javier Castaño

References

External links
Official website 
 BDFutbol profile
Futbolme team profile 
Official club blog 

 
Football clubs in Asturias
Association football clubs established in 1931
1931 establishments in Spain